Baccheius or Bacchius is a Greek name and may refer to:

 Bacchius of Tanagra, a commentator on the writings of Hippocrates
 Baccheius of Miletus, a writer. He wrote a work on agriculture.
 Bacchius, a gladiator
 Bacchius, grandfather of Justin Martyr
 Baccheius, an epithet of a wooden statue of Bacchus in Acrocorinth
 Baccheius, an epithet of Dionysus